Attitude is the second album by new jack swing group Troop released by Atlantic Records on October 13, 1989. The album features numerous debuts by a few well known musicians. The songs "My Music" and "I Will Always Love You" marked the debut of record producer Dallas Austin, who co-produced the songs with his mentor Joyce "Fenderella" Irby - a former member of the band Klymaxx. A then-unknown Trent Reznor appeared as one of the recording engineers on the Gerald Levert produced songs "That's My Attitude" and "For You". The video version of the single "Spread My Wings" was the one of the first songs remixed by hip hop producer Clark Kent.

Attitude was the highest-charting album from Troop, peaking within the Top 5 on the Top R&B Albums chart and received a gold certification.  It spawned the group's first two R&B hits to peak at number-one:  "Spread My Wings" and the cover of the Jackson 5 song, "All I Do Is Think of You," both of which was produced by singer and producer Chuckii Booker. Booker originally wanted to keep "Spread My Wings" for his 1989 debut Chuckii, but group member Steve Russell insisted on recording it for Attitude. Attitude remains as Troop's highest selling album to date.

Reception

Allmusic critic Craig Lytle described the record as "a reasonably representative album for the group."

Track listing

The song "Soupped Mix" is omitted from the LP version.

Personnel
 Keyboards and Drum programming: Dallas Austin, Joyce Irby, Zack Harmon, Christopher Troy, Chuckii Booker, Steve Russell, Marc Gordon
 Keyboard Programming: Jim Salamone
 Guitar: Thomas Organ, Randy Bowland
 Drums: Derek Organ
 Recording engineer: Alvin Speights, Mike Tarsia, Trent Reznor, Pete Tokar, Big Al Richardson, Craig Burbidge, Greg Barrett, Anthony Jeffries, Bob Siebert, D.C.
 Mixing: Joyce Irby, Dallas Austin, Mike Tarsia, Merlin Bobb, Craig Burbidge, Jerry Solomon, Chuckii Booker, Taavi Mote
 Executive producer: Sylvia Rhone, Merlin Bobb
 Mastering: Dennis King
 Photography: Jeff Katz
 Art Direction: Bob Defrin

Charts

Singles

External links
 Troop-Attitude at Discogs

References

1989 albums
Troop (band) albums
Atlantic Records albums